Robert "Bob" Marshall is an American politician who is a member of the Colorado House of Representatives from the 43rd district, which includes most of Highlands Ranch. He was elected in 2022 and assumed office in January 2023.

Background 
Marshall was born and raised in Evergreen, Colorado. Marshall attended Georgetown University and joined the Marines after graduating. He attended Cornell Law School and worked as a senior defense counsel and then station judge advocate at a Marine Corp Air Station in Japan. He then worked as a clerk on the US Court of Appeals and served in Iraq and Afghanistan. Afterwards, Marshall graduated from the University of San Diego School of Law and worked at the IRS.

Marshall was a Republican for over 30 years and left the party in 2017. Marshall cited the party's embrace of Donald Trump and the negative statements he made towards the family of Humayun Khan. Marshall stayed politically unaffiliated until he joined the Democratic Party in 2021.

Political career 
Before his candidacy, Marshall was active in local county politics. He sued the Douglas County School Board back in early 2022, accusing them of allegedly violating Colorado's open-meetings law before they terminated the superintendent which seen as a controversial decision.

Marshall ran unopposed in the Democratic primary election in early 2022 and was set to face Republican Kurt Huffman in the general election. The district was considered Republican-leaning but politically competitive. During his campaign Marshall focused on issues like public safety, public education, and the environment. Marshall also emphasized his military background and patriotism during the campaign. In an effort to reach voters, Marshall drove a World War II era Jeep plastered with campaign materials around the district and aired a commercial on Fox News positioning himself as a "Truman Democrat" who dislikes "communists" and "fascists"  and who ran to advance "public safety, public education and the environment."

In the 2022 Colorado state house elections, Marshall defeated incumbent Kurt Huffman by over 400 votes, flipping the district and making him the first Democrat to represent the district in over 10 years.

Tenure 
In the 2023 legislative session, Marshall sits on the Finance and Judiciary committees. He has previously outlined bills intended to be introduced during the session including topics like increasing teacher pay, veteran issues, countering crime and other issues surrounding local communities or legislation.

Personal life 
Marshall worked as an attorney before deciding to run for office. He is married and has one daughter. He is a Marine veteran of 28 years.

References

External links 

 Legislative website
 Campaign website

Democratic Party members of the Colorado House of Representatives
Living people
21st-century American politicians
People from Highlands Ranch, Colorado
People from Douglas County, Colorado
Georgetown University alumni
Cornell Law School alumni
University of San Diego School of Law alumni

Year of birth missing (living people)